

Administrative and municipal divisions

 ✪ - part of Agin-Buryat Okrug (Аги́нский Буря́тский о́круг)

References

See also
Administrative divisions of Chita Oblast
Administrative divisions of Agin-Buryat Autonomous Okrug

Zabaykalsky Krai
Zabaykalsky Krai